Charlotte Aagaard (born 1 December 1977) is a Danish former professional tennis player.

Aagaard represented the Denmark Fed Cup team in a total of 16 ties, between 1995 and 2001.

On the professional tour, Aagaard competed in ITF Circuit tournaments, winning six doubles titles.

ITF finals

Singles: 5 (0–5)

Doubles: 8 (6–2)

References

External links
 
 
 

1977 births
Living people
Danish female tennis players
20th-century Danish women